Ireland has participated in the Eurovision Song Contest 55 times since making its debut at the  contest in Naples, missing only two contests since, in  and . The contest final is broadcast in Ireland on RTÉ One. Ireland has a record total of seven wins, and is the only country to have won three times consecutively.

Ireland's seven wins were achieved by Dana with "All Kinds of Everything", Johnny Logan with "What's Another Year" and "Hold Me Now", Linda Martin with "Why Me", Niamh Kavanagh with "In Your Eyes", Paul Harrington and Charlie McGettigan with "Rock 'n' Roll Kids" and Eimear Quinn with "The Voice". Johnny Logan is the only performer to have won twice and also wrote the 1992 winning entry. Ireland, who also finished second with Sean Dunphy, Linda Martin, Liam Reilly and Marc Roberts, has a total of 18 top five results.

History
Raidió Teilifís Éireann (RTÉ) is Ireland's representative broadcaster at the contest. The semi-finals are broadcast on RTÉ2, with the final on RTÉ One.

Ireland has sent 50 entries to the Eurovision Song Contest; of these, seven have won and eighteen have finished in the top five, making Ireland the most successful country in the contest overall as of 2021. A strike at RTÉ in 1983 meant that the station lacked the resources to send a participant, so RTÉ broadcast the contest with the BBC commentary feed. Ireland was relegated in 2002, but in keeping with EBU rules since they intended to return in 2003, RTÉ broadcast that year's event and a TV commentator was sent to the contest in Tallinn. All of Ireland's entries have been performed in English with the exception of the  entry, "Ceol an Ghrá", which was sung in Irish.

This was followed by fifth-place finishes for both Colm C.T. Wilkinson and Cathal Dunne.

Logan went on to write the  entry "Terminal 3", performed by Linda Martin, which finished second. In , Logan returned to the context as a performer, and became the first and (to date) only entrant to win the contest twice, achieving his second victory with the self-penned "Hold Me Now".

The winning streak was broken in  when Hiberno-Nordic group Secret Garden, representing Norway, won with the almost entirely instrumental "Nocturne". The group does contain an Irish member, Naas-born Fionnuala Sherry.

In the 21st century, Ireland has fared less well, achieving considerably poorer results in comparison to the 1990s.

In , Ireland's luck changed when X Factor finalists Jedward finished in eighth place with 119 points, thus making them Ireland's most successful entry in 11 years. Their song "Lipstick" topped the iTunes charts in Austria, Germany, Ireland and Sweden. In , Ireland came last in the final for the second time.

Since her song received fewer points than the worst-scoring song of the first semi-final, it therefore came last overall, making it the worst placing for Ireland to date. She also finished last in the first semi-final, however did not come last overall.  saw another non-qualification in Brooke with "That's Rich", finishing 15th out of 18 countries in the second semi-final.

Eight people have written and composed more than one Irish entry: Brendan Graham (1976, 1985, 1994, 1996), Johnny Logan (1984, 1987, 1992), Tommy and Jimmy Swarbrigg (1975, 1977), Liam Reilly (1990, 1991), Joe Burkett (composer 1972, lyricist 1981), and Niall Mooney & Jonas Gladnikoff (2009, 2010).

In the years when the live orchestra was present in the contest, almost all of Ireland's Eurovision entries were conducted by Noel Kelehan. The exceptions were 1965 (Italian host conductor Gianni Ferrio), 1970 (Dutch host conductor Dolf van der Linden), from 1972 to 1975 (Colman Pearce), 1979 (Proinnsias Ó Duinn), 1994 (no conductor, although Kelehan conducted three other entries from Romania, Greece and Poland) and in 1997 (Frank McNamara was the musical director for the contest staged in Dublin, but the Irish entry was played with a backing track with no orchestra).

Ronan Keating (who presented the 1997 contest) collaborated on the 2009 entry for Denmark.

RTÉ presenter Marty Whelan has been the national commentator since .

Records 
Ireland holds the record for the most victories: seven wins including three consecutive wins. The country has also achieved second place four times and third once.

Ireland is one of the few countries to have achieved consecutive wins (along with Spain, Luxembourg and Israel) and the only country to win consecutively three times, and the nation won again in 1996, thereby accumulating four victories in five years.

Ireland is the only country to host the contest consecutively and is one of eight countries never to turn down the chance to host the event.

Out of 55 appearances and 45 finals, Ireland has reached the top ten 31 times and the top five 18 times. As of 2022, Ireland has not reached the top five since 1997.

Ireland holds the record for most points from one country in a year (alongside France) in the 'one point per juror' voting system, achieving nine votes out of a possible ten from Belgium (in ).

During the first semi-final of the 2014 contest, it was revealed that the duo Jedward hold two Eurovision records: the highest hair (18.9 cm) and the biggest shoulder pads.

Participation overview

Congratulations: 50 Years of the Eurovision Song Contest
Ireland was one of two countries to have two entries entered into Congratulations: 50 Years of the Eurovision Song Contest, with the  entry "What's Another Year" and the  "Hold Me Now". Co-host of the  contest Ronan Keating appeared. Johnny Logan performed his single "When a Woman Loved a Man". Irish winners Eimear Quinn, Charlie McGettigan and Linda Martin performed as backing singers to most of the songs with Jakob Sveistrup who represented  in 2005. Marty Whelan provided commentary of the contest for Ireland on RTÉ.

Hostings 
Ireland is the only country to have hosted multiple contests in succession; three in a row between 1993 and 1995. Six of the seven contests held in Ireland have been held in Dublin; three at the Point Theatre, two at the RDS Simmonscourt and one at the Gaiety Theatre. In addition, the 1993 contest was held in Millstreet, County Cork. Dublin holds the record for hosting the most contests of any Eurovision host city.

Awards

Marcel Bezençon Awards

Related involvement

Conductors

Heads of delegation

Commentators and spokespersons

Over the years RTÉ commentary has been provided by several experienced radio and television presenters, including Larry Gogan, Jimmy Greeley, Gay Byrne, Ronan Collins, Pat Kenny and Mike Murphy. Marty Whelan has provided the RTÉ television commentary since 2000, although Whelan himself had previously commentated for the 1987 event. Ireland did not participate in the 1983 edition in Germany, nor did they send a commentator to Munich that year, but instead broadcast the BBC feed of the contest with Terry Wogan as commentator, who welcomed viewers in Ireland during his introduction. RTÉ Radio, however, did provide commentary by Brendan Balfe.

Gallery

See also
Ireland in the Junior Eurovision Song Contest – Junior version of the Eurovision Song Contest.
Ireland in the Eurovision Dance Contest – Dance version of the Eurovision Song Contest.
Ireland in the Eurovision Young Dancers – A competition organised by the EBU for younger dancers aged between 16 and 21.
Ireland in the Eurovision Young Musicians – A competition organised by the EBU for musicians aged 18 years and younger.

Notes

References

External links
 Ireland Eurovision fan website escireland.com
 Points to and from Ireland eurovisioncovers.co.uk

 
Countries in the Eurovision Song Contest
Eurovision Song Contest